Cerro de la Neblina (lit. "Mountain of the Mist"), also known as Serra da Neblina in Brazil and Sierra de la Neblina in Venezuela, is a sandstone massif located in the northern Amazon Basin. It is a tilted, heavily eroded plateau, with a deep canyon in its central portion (Cañón Grande), drained by the Baria River.

Most of the massif is in Venezuelan territory, but its southeastern ridge forms part of the Brazil–Venezuela border, and this ridge is where the highest point in the massif, Pico da Neblina, is located. Pico da Neblina is inside Brazilian territory, but only a few hundred metres from the Venezuelan border.

The slightly lower Pico 31 de Março or Pico Phelps,  a.s.l., lies next to Pico da Neblina, on the precise international border. Pico 31 de Março/Phelps is Brazil's second-highest mountain and the highest in Venezuela outside of the Andes. The massif's other named peaks include Pico Cardona, Pico Maguire, and Pico Zuloaga.

The massif was first explored in 1954 by an American expedition led by Bassett Maguire of the New York Botanical Garden that performed an aerial inspection and then climbed the massif's northwestern slopes. In January 1999, a group of carnivorous plant enthusiasts climbed Pico da Neblina following a 30 km hike up the previously unexplored northeastern ridge.
In 1972, Maguireocharis neblinae Steyerm. in the family Rubiaceae, was published and named after the massif and the explorer, Bassett Maguire.

Cerro de la Neblina is sometimes referred to as the Neblina Massif, though this term may also encompass Cerro Aracamuni and Cerro Avispa (a grouping of mountains more precisely known as the Neblina–Aracamuni Massif).

Maguire's passage to Venezuela was provided by Gulf Oil executive Willard F. Jones.

See also
 Distribution of Heliamphora
 Neblina uakari
 Pico da Neblina National Park
 Koyamaea neblinensis

References

Further reading

 Aymard Corredor, G.A. & J.R. Grande Allende (September 2012). Duranta neblinensis (Verbenaceae, Duranteae): a new species from Sierra de la Neblina, Amazonas state, Venezuela. Brittonia 64(3): 246–251. 
 Beau-Douëzy, J.-P., M. Cambornac & E. Sampers (1999). Neblina: Of Mists and Scents. Éditions de la Martinière, Paris.  review
 Berry, P.E. & M. Olson (October/December 1998). A new rheophytic species of Euceraea (Flacourtiaceae) from Sierra de la Neblina, Venezuela. Brittonia 50(4): 493–496. 
  Brewer-Carías, C. (September 1972).  Natura 48/49: 4–7.
  Brewer-Carías, C. (May 1973).  Defensa de la Naturaleza 2(6): 17–26.
  Brewer-Carías, C. (ed.) (1988). Cerro de la Neblina: Resultados de la Expedición 1983–1987. Fundación para el Desarrollo de las Ciencias Físicas, Matemáticas y Naturales, Caracas. 
 De Marmels, J. (1989). Odonata or dragonflies from Cerro de la Neblina and the adjacent lowland between the Río Baria, the Casiquiare and the Río Negro (Venezuela). I. Adults. Boletin de la Academia de Ciencias Físicas, Matemáticas y Naturales 25: 11–78.
 De Marmels, J. (1989). Odonata or dragonflies from Cerro de la Neblina and the adjacent lowland between the Río Baria, the Casiquiare and the Río Negro (Venezuela). II. Additions to the adults. Boletin de la Academia de Ciencias Físicas, Matemáticas y Naturales 25: 81–91.
  de Phelps, K.D. (1986). Memorias de Misia Kathy: primera Expedición Phelps al "Cerro Jimé," actual Cerro de la Neblina, enero-febrero, 1954. Tecniproven, Caracas. 
  Dickerman, R.W. & W.H. Phelps Jr. (1987). Tres nuevos atrapamoscas (Tyrannidae) del Cerro de la Neblina Territorio Amazonas, Venezuela. Boletín de la Sociedad Venezolana de Ciencias Naturales 41(144): 27–32.
  Fróis, R.D.L. (October–December 1956). O "Cerro de la Neblina" seria um pico da serra do Caburi. Revista Brasileira de Geografia 18(4): 535–538.
 Gardner, A.L. (1989). Two new mammals from southern Venezuela and comments on the affinities of the highland fauna of Cerro de la Neblina. In: K.H. Redford & J.F. Eisenberg (eds.) Advances in Neotropical Mammalogy. Sandhill Crane Press, Gainesville. pp. 411–424. 
 Givnish, T.J., R.W. McDiarmid & W.R. Buck (1 November 1986). Fire adaptation in Neblinaria celiae (Theaceae), a high-elevation rosette shrub endemic to a wet equatorial tepui. Oecologia 70(4): 481–485. 
  Joly, L.J. (1990). Los Ibidionini (Coleoptera: Cerambycidae) de la expedición al Cerro de la Neblina, Venezuela. Revista de la Facultad de Agronomía 16: 207–218.
 Lourenço, W.R. & J.L. Cloudsley-Thompson (2010).  Boletín de la Sociedad Entomológica Aragonesa 47: 293–298.
 Maier, C.A. & P.J. Spangler (7 July 2011). Hypsilara royi gen. n. and sp. n. (Coleoptera, Elmidae, Larainae) from southern Venezuela, with a revised key to Larainae of the Western Hemisphere. Zookeys 116: 25–36. 
 Myers, C.W., E.E. Williams & R.W. McDiarmid (9 September 1993). A new anoline lizard (Phenacosaurus) from the highland of Cerro de la Neblina, southern Venezuela. American Museum Novitates, no. 3070: 1–15.
  Osuna, E. (1984). Notas sobre Triatominae (Hemiptera: Reduviidae) del Parque Nacional "Cerro de la Neblina" Territorio Federal Amazonas, Venezuela. Boletín de la Dirección de Malariología y Saneamiento Ambiental 24: 45–46.
 Phelps, W.H. & W.H. Phelps Jr. (31 October 1955). Seven new birds from Cerro de la Neblina, Territorio Amazonas, Venezuela. Proceedings of the Biological Society of Washington 68: 113–123.
 Phelps, W.H. & W.H. Phelps Jr. (8 December 1961). A new subspecies of warbler from Cerro de la Neblina, Venezuela, and notes. Proceedings of the Biological Society of Washington 74: 245–247.
  Phelps, W.H. & W.H. Phelps Jr. (1965). Lista de las aves del Cerro de la Neblina, Venezuela, y notas sobre su descubrimiento y ascenso. Boletín de la Sociedad Venezolana de Ciencias Naturales 26(109): 11–35.
 Redhead, S. & R.E. Halling (May–June 1987). Xeromphalina nubium sp. nov. (Basidiomycetes) from Cerro de la Neblina, Venezuela. Mycologia 79(3): 383–386.
 Renner, S.S. (1989). Floral biological observations on Heliamphora tatei Sarraceniaceae and other plants from Cerro de la Neblina in Venezuela. Plant Systematics and Evolution 163(1–2): 21–30. 
 Rivadavia, F., V.F.O. de Miranda, G. Hoogenstrijd, F. Pinheiro, G. Heubl & A. Fleischmann (July 2012). Is Drosera meristocaulis a pygmy sundew? Evidence of a long-distance dispersal between Western Australia and northern South America. Annals of Botany 110(1): 11–21. 
 Rogers, J.D., B.E. Callan, A.Y. Rossman & G.J. Samuels (January–March 1988). Xylaria (Sphaeriales, Xylariaceae) from Cerro de la Neblina, Venezuela. Mycotaxon 51(1): 103–153.
 Roze, J. A. (September 1987). Summary of coral snakes (Elapidae) from Cerro de la Neblina, Venezuela, with description of a new subspecies. Revue Française d'Aquariologie, Herpétologie 14(3): 109–112.
 Savage, H.M. (1987). Two new species of Miroculis from Cerro de la Neblina, Venezuela with new distribution records for Miroculis fittkaui and Microphlebia surinamensis (Ephemeroptera: Leptophlebiidae). Aquatic Insects: International Journal of Freshwater Entomology 9(2): 97–108. 
 Spangler, P.J. (July 1985). A new genus and species of riffle beetle, Neblinagena prima, from the Venezuelan tepui, Cerro de la Neblina (Coleoptera, Elmidae, Larinae). Proceedings of the Entomological Society of Washington 87(3): 538–544.
 Spangler, P.J. (July 1986). Two new species of water-striders of the genus Oiovelia from the tepui Cerro de la Neblina, Venezuela (Hemiptera: Veliidae). Proceedings of the Entomological Society of Washington 88(3): 438–450.
 Spangler, P.J. (April 1987). A new species of water penny beetle, Pheneps cursitatus, from Cerro de la Neblina, Venezuela (Coleoptera: Dryopoidea: Psephenidae). Proceedings of the Entomological Society of Washington 89(2): 219–225.
 Struwe, L., M. Thiv, J.W. Kadereit, A.S.R. Pepper, T.J. Motley, P.J. White, J.H.E. Rova, K. Potgieter & V.A. Albert (December 1998). Saccifolium (Saccifoliaceae), an endemic of Sierra de la Neblina on the Brazilian–Venezuelan border, is related to a temperate-alpine lineage of Gentianaceae. Harvard Papers in Botany 3(2): 199–214.
 Struwe, L., S. Nilsson & V.A. Albert (June 2008). Roraimaea (Gentianaceae: Helieae)—a new gentian genus from white sand campinas and Cerro de la Neblina of Brazil and Venezuela. Harvard Papers in Botany 13(1): 35–45. 
 Thomas, W.W. & G. Davidse (April–June 1989). Koyamaea neblinensis, a new genus and species of Cyperaceae (Sclerioideae) from Cerro de la Neblina, Venezuela and Brazil. Systematic Botany 14(2): 189–196. 
 Viloria, A.L. (1995). Description of a new species of Pedaliodes (Lepidoptera: Satyridae: Pronophilini) from the Cerro de La Neblina, Venezuela. Atalanta 25(3–4): 525–529.
 Willard, D.E., M.S. Foster, G.F. Barrowclough, R.W. Dickerman, P.F. Cannell, S.L. Coats, J.L. Cracraft & J.P. O'Neill (31 October 1991). The birds of Cerro de la Neblina, Territorio Federal Amazonas, Venezuela. Fieldiana: Zoology 65: 1–80.
 Wooldridge, D.P. (March 1993). Three new Limnichidae from Cerro de la Neblina, Venezuela (Coleoptera: Dryopoidea). The Coleopterists Bulletin 47(1): 35–37. 
 Zweifel, R.G. (16 December 1986). A new genus and species of microhylid frog from the Cerro de la Neblina region of Venezuela and a discussion of relationships among New World microhylid genera. American Museum Novitates, no. 2863: 1–24.

Inselbergs of South America
Tepuis of Brazil
Mountains of Brazil
Mountains of Venezuela
International mountains of South America
Guayana Highlands
Brazil–Venezuela border
Geography of Amazonas (Venezuelan state)
Plateaus of Venezuela
Plateaus of Brazil
Tepuis of Venezuela